Jacobus "Kobus" Vandenberg (born 17 July 1950, in Hilversum) is a sailor from the Netherlands. Since the Netherlands did boycott the Moscow Olympic Games Vandenberg represented his National Olympic Committee at the 1980 Summer Olympics, which was boycotted by several countries, in Tallinn, USSR under the Dutch NOC flag. With Boudewijn Binkhorst as helmsman, Vandenberg took the 6th place in the Star. In the 1988 Olympics in Pusan Vandenberg made his second Olympic appearance. Again in the Dutch Star this time with Steven Bakker as helmsman. They took 9th place.

Sources
 
 
 
 
 
 
 
 
 
 
 
 
 
 
 
 

Living people
1950 births
Dutch male sailors (sport)
Olympic sailors of the Netherlands
Sailors at the 1980 Summer Olympics – Star
Sailors at the 1988 Summer Olympics – Star
Sportspeople from Hilversum